"Oh! Battagliero" is a single released by the Italian punk rock band CCCP Fedeli alla linea in 1987.

"Oh! Battagliero" and "Guerra e pace" have been included in the album Socialismo e Barbarie when Virgin Records re-released this album on Compact Disc in 1988.

Track listing
 "Oh! Battagliero"
 "Guerra e pace"

See also
 CCCP discography
 Consorzio Suonatori Indipendenti (C.S.I.)
 Per Grazia Ricevuta (PGR)
 Punk rock

1987 singles
CCCP Fedeli alla linea songs
1987 songs
Virgin Records singles